The Caucasus Viceroyalty was the Russian Empire's administrative and political authority in the Caucasus region exercised through the offices of glavnoupravlyayushchiy ("high commissioner") (1801–1844, 1882–1902) and namestnik ("viceroy") (1844–1882, 1904–1917). These two terms are commonly, but imprecisely, translated into English as viceroy, which is frequently used interchangeably with governor general. More accurately, glavnoupravlyayushchiy is referred to as the High Commissioner of the Caucasus, and namestnik as Viceroy.

Over more than a century of the Russian rule of the Caucasus, the structure of the viceroyalty underwent a number of changes, with the addition or removal of administrative positions and redrawing of provincial divisions.

History

The first time Russian authority was established over the peoples of the Caucasus was after the Russian annexation of the Kingdom of Kartli-Kakheti (eastern Georgia) in 1801. General Karl Knorring was the first person to be assigned to govern the Caucasus territory, being officially titled as the Commander-in-Chief in Georgia and Governor-General of Tiflis (present-day Tbilisi). Under of his successors, notably Prince Pavel Tsitsianov, General Aleksey Yermolov, Count Ivan Paskevich, and Prince Mikhail Vorontsov, Russian Transcaucasia expanded to encompass territories acquired in a series of wars with the Ottoman Empire, the Persian Empire, and local North Caucasian peoples. The scope of its jurisdiction eventually came to include what is now Georgia, Armenia, Azerbaijan, and the North Caucasus, as well as parts of Northeastern Turkey (today the provinces of Artvin, Ardahan, Kars, and Iğdır).

Headquartered at Tiflis, the viceroys acted as de facto ambassadors to neighboring countries, commanders in chief of the armed forces, and the supreme civil authority, mostly responsible only to the Tsar. From February 3, 1845, to January 23, 1882, the viceregal authority was supervised by the Caucasus Committee as the Caucasus Krai, which consisted of representatives of the State Council and the ministries of Finances, State Domains, Justice, and Interior, as well as of members of special committees. After the 1917 February Revolution, which dispossessed Tsar Nicholas II of the Russian crown, the Viceroyalty of the Caucasus was abolished by the Russian Provisional Government on March 18, 1917, and all authority, except in the zone of the active army, was entrusted to the civil administrative body called the Special Transcaucasian Committee or Ozakom (short for Osobyy Zakavkazskiy Komitet, Особый Закавказский Комитет).

Administrative divisions
In 1917, there were six guberniyas ("governorates"), five oblasts ("regions"), two special administrative okrugs ("districts"), and a gradonachalstvo ("municipal district") within the Caucasus Viceroyalty:

Demographics

Kavkazskiy kalendar 

High commissioners and viceroys of the Caucasus 

Karl Heinrich von Knorring 1801–1802
Pavel Tsitsianov 1802–1806
Ivan Gudovich 1806–1809
Alexander Tormasov 1809–1811
Philip Paulucci 1811–1812
Nikolay Rtishchev 1812–1816
Aleksey Yermolov 1816–1827
Ivan Paskevich 1827–1831
Gregor von Rosen 1831–1838
Yevgeny Golovin 1838–1842
Aleksandr Neidgardt 1842–1844
Mikhail Vorontsov 1844–1854
Nikolay Muravyov-Karsky 1854–1856
Aleksandr Baryatinsky 1856–1862
Grigol Orbeliani (acting) 1862
Grand Duke Mikhail Nikolayevich 1862–1882
Aleksandr Dondukov-Korsakov 1882–1890
Sergei Sheremetyev 1890–1896
Grigory Golitsyn 1896–1904
Yakov Malama (acting) 1904
Illarion Vorontsov-Dashkov 1904–1916
Grand Duke Nikolay Nikolayevich 1916–1917

Notes

References

Bibliography

Further reading

See also

 Caucasus Viceroyalty (1785–1796)
 
 

 
Viceroyalties of the Russian Empire
History of the Caucasus under the Russian Empire
Modern history of Armenia
Modern history of Azerbaijan
Modern history of Georgia (country)
Governorates-General of the Russian Empire
.
.
.
20th century in Armenia
20th century in Azerbaijan
20th century in Georgia (country)
1801 establishments in the Russian Empire
1917 disestablishments in Russia
1801 establishments in Asia
1917 disestablishments in Asia
1800s establishments in Georgia (country)
1917 disestablishments in Georgia (country)
1801 establishments in Europe
1917 disestablishments in Europe
History of Transcaucasia